Wallball (or wall ball) is a name given to several sports that involve hitting a ball off of a wall with your hands or feet. It may refer to:

 American handball, a North American sport played with a small rubber ball
 Butts Up, a North American schoolyard game
 Downball, an Australian indoor ball game
 One-wall handball, also known as International fronton, is a code of both American handball and Gaelic handball
 Suicide (game), a game where players throw a rubber ball at a wall, and at opponents
 Wallball (children's game), a North American schoolyard game similar to squash
 Chinese handball, a 20th century North American street game
 A baseball minigame in the 2008 video game Mario Super Sluggers

See also
 Basque pelota, a European game played similarly to those above
 Wallyball, a game similar to volleyball, where the ball can be bounced off of walls
 Pêl-Law (Welsh handball), a similar wall game played in Wales.